Amatsukaze Masao, born Masao Miyanaga (1 December 1937 – 30 April 2013), was a sumo wrestler from Monzen, Ishikawa, Japan. He made his professional debut in May 1955 and reached the top division in September 1962. His highest rank was maegashira 3. He left the sumo world upon retirement in May 1967.

Career record
The Kyushu tournament was first held in 1957, and the Nagoya tournament in 1958.

See also
Glossary of sumo terms
List of past sumo wrestlers
List of sumo tournament second division champions

References

1937 births
2013 deaths
Japanese sumo wrestlers
Sumo people from Ishikawa Prefecture